Denhead railway station served the area of Denhead, Angus, Scotland from 1900 to 1929 on the Carmyllie Railway.

History 
The station opened on 1 February 1900 by the Dundee and Arbroath Railway. To the west was a siding that existed before the station opened and was relaid when it opened. The station closed on 1 January 1917 but reopened in September 1917, although it was only open on Saturdays. It fully reopened on 1 January 1918, before closing permanently on 2 December 1929.

References

External links 

Disused railway stations in Angus, Scotland
Former Dundee and Arbroath Railway stations
Railway stations in Great Britain opened in 1900
Railway stations in Great Britain closed in 1929
1900 establishments in Scotland
1929 disestablishments in Scotland